Chŭngsan County is a kun (county) in South Pyongan Province, North Korea.

Re-education Camp No. 11, a large prison mostly for repatriated refugees, is located in the northwestern part of Chŭngsan County.

Administrative divisions
Chŭngsan county is divided into 1 ŭp (town) and 17 ri (villages):

Transportation
Chŭngsan county is served by the Namdong Branch of the Korean State Railway's P'yŏngnam Line.

References

External links
  Map of Pyongan provinces
  Detailed map

Counties of South Pyongan